"Hibernaculum" is the 17th episode of season 4 of the supernatural drama television series Grimm  and the 83rd episode overall, which premiered on April 10, 2015, on NBC. The episode was written by Michael Golamco and was directed by John Behring.

Plot

Opening quote: "Ah! It was colder than ice; it penetrated to his very heart."

Nick (David Giuntoli), Hank (Russell Hornsby), and Wu (Reggie Lee) are called to investigate a rare Wesen that leaves its victims dead from extreme hypothermia, frozen solid within just a matter of minutes. According to Rosalee they're called Varme Tyv (Norwegian for 'Heat Thief') - a Blue Racer (Coluber constrictor foxii) snake-like Wesen, which if/when away from their hibernacula during winter, can't survive without taking body heat from someone else. Since they lack the ability to create their own body heat, they too would freeze to death otherwise. Other sources of heat (such as fire or somesuch) would be useless for survival since their physiology can only process human body heat. If safely overwintered in their hibernacula, where they usually huddle for heat with their own kind, they're otherwise harmless, especially during summer or warm weather. Nick & co', after consequently finding further victims (three in all), they attempt to ascertain if they're after just one or more culprits. When they finally run down the main suspect to his hibernaculum, on attempting to disentangle him from the others, they inadvertently wake up the whole cluster of Varma Tyv, who had all been hibernating in a tangled, huddled heap in the centre of the heated underground cellar room. Startled out of hibernation, they defend themselves by attacking the intruding trio. Massively outnumbered, the trio attempt to flee back up and out. Just as they're about to be overpowered by the charging hoard, the now exposed and therefore increasingly incapacitated by the cold bunch, thankfully start to freeze before they can inflict much harm. Nick is however overcome with guilt, since according to their investigation only one of them was ever guilty of murder, Nick's unable to let the rest die when innocent of any crime. Nick decides they need to carry them all back inside, back into cozy hibernation, before they freeze to death. The guilty murderous one, however, is left to suffer the same fate he'd previously meted out to his victims.

Meanwhile, Juliette (Bitsie Tulloch) starts to feel that she is losing her humanity and attempts to seek help from Rosalee & Monroe. Angered by the fact that Nick had already disclosed her 'secret-Hexenbiest-state' to Hank, she fiercely woges, shocking them all, then leaves in a huff. Instead now intent on seeking revenge against Adalind (Claire Coffee). She pursuits Adalind when she's out shopping and overcome with vengeful emotions, telekinetically attempts to dislodge a large stone gargoyle off the side of a building onto her head, in the hopes she's crushed beneath. Adalind's alert 'bodyguard/jailer' saves her just in the nick of time, but not before Adalind is able to get a glimpse of Juliette reflected in the window before her. Now aware Juliette means to kill her and fearing for her life, she later begs new Royal Kenneth to avenge her before Juliette is able to strike again. Kenneth refuses, insisting they can instead use the situation to their advantage. Elsewhere, Captain Renard (Sasha Roiz) continues to suffer from mysterious bleeding and disturbing visions - where large disembodied black-taloned, red daemon-like claws, clutch at him; leaving him shaken and confused as he collapses.  While elsewhere, Monroe (Silas Weir Mitchell) works toward coming to grips with the Wesenrein incident which still invades his mind and left him with somewhat PTSD-like symptoms and hand tremors which are foiling his much loved clock restoring endeavours. Ever sensitive Rosalee, first probes then comforts him, ensuring him their "clocks have been reset", so not to fear as they've yet much time left to continue enjoying their lives.

As Nick returns to a dark and now empty-without-Juliette home, sad and lost in thought, he's suddenly overcome with visions of his aunt. He recalls words once told him that now seem far more prophetically charged : "The misfortune of our family is already passing on to you. I know you love Juliette, but you must end it and never see Juliette again." ...

Reception

Viewers
The episode was viewed by 4.76 million people, earning a 1.1/4 in the 18-49 rating demographics on the Nielson ratings scale, ranking third on its timeslot and seventh for the night in the 18-49 demographics, behind The Amazing Race, Hawaii Five-0, Last Man Standing, Blue Bloods, 20/20, and Shark Tank. This was a 5% increase in viewership from the previous episode, which was watched by 4.51 million viewers with a 1.0/4. This means that 1.1 percent of all households with televisions watched the episode, while 4 percent of all households watching television at that time watched it. With DVR factoring in, the episode was watched by 6.87 million viewers and had a 1.8 ratings share in the 18-49 demographics.

Critical reviews
"Hibernaculum" received mixed-to-positive reviews. Les Chappell from The A.V. Club gave the episode a "C+" rating and wrote, "It's difficult to pin down my feelings on this week's episode of Grimm, because more than any episode in recent memory, this is one where my appreciation of what's going on fluctuates wildly with every scene. The various twists in the case of the week were confounded by the way it stretched credulity, even by this show's standards. (How many corpsicles can you have in a city before reasonable people start asking what's going on?) Interesting parts of the Monroe, Renard, and Juliette stories were introduced and almost immediately pushed aside by the next scene. And for a weekly case that was succeeding on its own merits, it's infuriating to see the show get rid of its complexity in favor of trying to emulate The Walking Dead — the worst season of Walking Dead, no less. (Stupid farm.)"

Kathleen Wiedel from TV Fanatic, gave a 3.8 star rating out of 5, stating: "I have to admit, I got a good amount of guilty pleasure when Adalind realized that Juliette was hunting her. Yeah, not so fun when you're on the receiving end, is it, Adalind?"

MaryAnn Sleasman from TV.com, wrote, "One of the themes that consistently appears in Grimms Wesen stories is the difficult balancing of existence in both the Wesen world and the human world. It's one of the reasons the show's universe has expanded to become increasingly complex and interesting, complete with monsters who are often more human than the humans themselves. However, it seems that lately, Grimm has focused much more heavily on unusual Wesen and dealt them some pretty terrible outcomes."

Christine Horton of Den of Geek wrote, "On reflection, Hibernaculum could be classed as one of the stranger episodes, even for a show based on fairytales."

References

External links
 

Grimm (season 4) episodes
2015 American television episodes